The Men's R1 10 metre air rifle standing SH1 event at the 2020 Summer Paralympics took place on 30 August at the Asaka Shooting Range in Tokyo.

The event consisted of two rounds: a qualifier and a final. In the qualifier, each shooter fired 60 shots with an air rifle at 10 metres distance from the "standing" (interpreted to include seated in wheelchairs) position.

The top 8 shooters in the qualifying round moved on to the final round.

Records
Prior to this competition, the existing world and Paralympic records were as follows.

Schedule
All times are Japan Standard Time (UTC+9)

Qualification round

Final

References

Men's 10 metre air rifle standing SH1